History and Theory is a quarterly peer-reviewed academic journal published by Wiley-Blackwell on behalf of Wesleyan University. The journal was established in 1960 by George H Nadel. Its current editor-in-chief is Ethan Kleinberg (Wesleyan University). The journal focuses on the nature of history, including the philosophy of history, historiography, historical methodology, critical theory, and time and culture.

External links 
 

Wiley-Blackwell academic journals
English-language journals
Publications established in 1960
History journals
Quarterly journals
Wesleyan University